Oh, What a Life may refer to:

Music
 "Oh, What a Life" (originally "O welch' ein Leben") English version of aria for tenor by Beethoven, written in German for insertion in the 1779 Singspiel Die schöne Schusterinn by Ignaz Umlauf
 "Oy, Is Dus a Leben!" (Oh, What a Life!) 1942 musical comedy by Joseph Rumshinsky of New York's Yiddish Art Theater

Albums
 Oh, What a Life (album), is the 2014 debut album of American Authors

Songs
 "Oh, What a Life", 1969 song by Dave Berry, B-side to "Huma-Lama"
 "Oh, What a Life" (song), 1997 song by Gloria Gaynor
 "O What a Life", calypso song by Mighty Shadow
 "Ooh, What a Life" (song), 1979 song by Gibson Brothers

See also
 What a Life (disambiguation)